Şeyma Erenli Kraemer (born 9 December 1988) is a Turkish-Australian women's football midfielder. She was a member of the Turkey women's national team.

Private life
Şeyma Erenli was born to Turkish immigrant parents Zeki and Ayşe Erenli in Melbourne, Victoria, Australia on 9 December 1988. Her father was an amateur footballer in Turkey. He continued to play in Australia with the Turkish club Gençlik Gücü. Şeyma was inspired by her father in football, and was supported by her entire family members.

She was in the high school at the Royal Melbourne Institute of Technology before she attended Indiana State University in Terre Haute, Indiana, the United States in 2008 to study physical education teaching. She graduated early December 2011, and went back to Australia in January 2012. However, she returned to the place of her alma mater in the United States in August 2013.

Playing career

Club
Erenli began playing football in the age of six. Her first club was Endeavour United SC.

She played five seasons for Ashburton Women's Soccer Club in her hometown, which competed in the Victorian Women's Premier League. She captained the team in three seasons. She was named the Best Female Athlete in her class each year.

During her college years in the United States, she was a member of the Indiana State Sycamores from 2008 to 2011. The team competed in the Division 1, the highest level university league. She capped 53 times in three seasons.

After returning to Australia, she played with her former club Ashburton Women's SC. She then transferred to Box Hill United SC in her hometown.

She is known for not missing a penalty kick. She admits that she learned successful penalty kicking from her father.

International
Erenli was admitted to the Turkey women's national football team and debuted in the 2011 FIFA Women's World Cup qualification – UEFA Group 5 match against England in Walsall, England on 29 July 2010. She took part in the UEFA Women's Euro 2013 qualifying – Group 2 matches against Romania, and Switzerland. She capped in total five times for the Turkey national team.

References

Living people
1988 births
Soccer players from Melbourne
Australian people of Turkish descent
Women's association football midfielders
Australian women's soccer players
Australian women's futsal players
Turkish women's footballers
Turkey women's international footballers
Expatriate women's soccer players in the United States
Australian expatriate sportspeople in the United States
Indiana State Sycamores women's soccer players
Turkish expatriate sportspeople in the United States
Australian expatriate women's soccer players
Turkish expatriate women's footballers